G. Kemble Bennett is a Senior Professor of engineering at Texas A&M University. He is a fellow of the Institute of Industrial and Systems Engineers and of the International Society of Logistics.

Education 
Bennett received a Bachelors of Science degree in Mathematics with a minor in Chemistry from Florida State University in 1962.
He received his Masters of Science in Engineering Mathematics from San Jose State University in 1968.
He then received his Ph.D. in Industrial Engineering from Texas Tech University in 1970.

Career 
In 2006, Bennett was appointed by then Texas Governor Rick Perry as a board chair, among other positions, on the Texas Board of Professional Engineers.

In 2011, Bennett stepped down as the Dean of the Dwight Look College of Engineering at Texas A&M University.

Currently, he is a senior professor in the Industrial & Systems Engineering department in the Dwight Look College of Engineering.

Awards 
 Frank and Lillian Gilbreth Industrial Engineering Award

References

External links 
 Official website

American engineers
1940 births
Living people
Texas A&M University faculty
Florida State University alumni
San Jose State University alumni
Texas Tech University alumni